Yi Gwangsu (1892–1950) was a Korean writer and poet, and a notable Korean independence and nationalist activist until his later turn towards collaboration with the Japanese. His pen names were Chunwon and Goju. Yi is best known for his novel Mujeong (Heartless), sometimes described as the first Korean novel. Yi Gwangsu was born Yi Bogyeong on February 1, 1892.

Life
Yi Gwangsu was born in 1892 in Jeongju. He was orphaned at about age 10 and grew up with Donghak believers. In 1904, around the time of the Donghak Peasant Revolution, he moved to Seoul in order to avoid the authorities. In 1905 he went to Japan for his education. Upon returning to Korea in 1913, he taught at Osan School in Jeongju. He later moved back to Tokyo and became one of the leaders of the anti-colonial student movement.

In 1919 he moved to Shanghai and served in the Korean Provisional Government and became president of The Independent, a newspaper in Shanghai. Yi returned to Korea in 1921 and founded the Alliance for Self-Improvement, established on principles of enlightenment and self-help. From 1923 to 1934 Yi pursued a career in journalism working for several newspapers, including two that survive today, the Dong-a Ilbo and the Chosun Ilbo.

Yi was imprisoned in 1937 due to the Self-Cultivation Friendship Association (修養同友會/수양동우회) incident, and released half a year later due to illness. During this period he recanted his anti-Japanese stance and leaned more towards collaboration. In 1939, Yi became the first head of the pro-Japanese Korean Writers Association (朝鮮文人協會/조선문인협회) and lead intense efforts to Japanize (hwangminhwa) Korea. He eagerly adopted the name Kayama Mitsurou (香山光郎) as soon as the Sōshi-kaimei policy came into effect.

In 1945, after Korean independence, Yi fled to the countryside. He was arrested for collaboration in 1949. After the war, the Special Committee for the Investigation of Anti-nationalist Activities found Yi guilty of collaboration. In 1950 Yi was captured by the North Korean army and died in Manpo on October 25, most likely of tuberculosis.

Family
Yi had two younger sisters, Lee Ae-Kyung (이애경) and Lee Ae-Ran (이애란). Yi married twice, first to Heo Young-sook (허영숙), then to Baek Hye-soon (백혜순). He had three sons, Lee Jin-keun (이진근), Lee Pong-keun (이봉근), and Lee Young-keun (이영근); and two daughters, Chung-Nan Lee Kim (이정란) and Chung-Wha Lee Lyenger (이정화).

Work
Yi was a fiction writer and essayist. His essays originally focused on the need for national consciousness. His fiction was among the first modern fiction in Korea and he is most famous for his novel, Mujeong (The Heartless). Mujeong was a description of the crossroads at which Korea found itself, stranded between tradition and modernity and undergoing conflict between social realities and traditional ideals. His career can be split into thirds. The first period (that of Mujeong), from 1910-19 featured a strong attack on Korea's traditional society and the belief that Korea should adopt a more modern ("Western") worldview. From the early 1920s to the 1930s, Yi transformed into a dedicated nationalist and published a controversial essay, "On the Remaking of National Consciousness", which advocated a moral overhaul of Korea and blamed Koreans for being defeatist. The third period, from the 1930s on, coincided with Yi's conversion to Buddhism, and his work consequently became noticeably Buddhist in tone. This was also the period in which, as noted above, Yi became a Japanese collaborator.

Yi's professional judgment could be as fickle as his politics. In one famous case he befriended then abandoned the fellow writer Kim Myeong-sun, allegedly because his own beliefs about modernism had shifted. Yi has also been considered one of the pioneers of queer literature in Korea with the publishing of Is it Love (Ai ka) in 1909, when Yi was 17.

Works (Partial) 
 Is It Love (사랑인가 愛か), 1909
 Young Sacrifice (어린 희생)
 Mujeong (Heartless) (무정), 1917
 Reincarnation (재생)
 A Boy's Sorrow (소년의 비애)
 Pioneer (개척자)
 Nameless (무명)
 Soil (흙), 1932
 Crown Prince Maui (마의태자 麻衣太子), 1928
 Danjong Aesa (단종애사 端宗哀史), 1929
 Oil Well (유정 油井)
 Love (사랑), 1938
 Sejo of Joseon (세조대왕)
 Wife of the Revolutionary (혁명가의 아내)
 Aeyog-ui Pian (애욕의 피안)
 Grandmother (할멈)
 Kashil (가실 嘉實)
 My Confession (나의 고백)
 Ambassador Wonhyo (원효대사)
 Death of Yichadon (이차돈의 죽음)
 Biography of Yi Sun-sin (전기 이순신)
 Biography of Ahn Changho (전기 안창호)
 Dosan, Ahn Changho (도산, 안창호)
 Stone Pillow (돌베개)

Translated works in English
 Mujŏng, translated by Ann Sung-Hi Lee (Cornell University: Cornell East Asia Series, 2005) 
 The Soil, translated by Sun-Ae Hwang and Horace Jeffrey Hodges (Dalkey Archive Press, 2013) 
 Kashil and Best Essays by Yi Kwang-su, translated by Chung-Nan Lee Kim (Archway Publishing, 2014)

References

External links

 Yi Gwang-su: Pro-Japanese? 
 Queering Korean Literature: Author and Activist Yi Gwang-su 
 북한, 6·25 납북인사 묘역 첫 공개 조선일보 2005.07.26
 춘원 이광수의 `무정'' 영문판 출판 조선일보 2005.10.23
 춘원 이광수는 어떻게 친일로 변절했나 오마이뉴스 2005.09.18
 [책마을] 친일과 애국 사이… 춘원의 두얼굴 조선일보 2000.01.10

1892 births
1950 deaths
People from Chongju
Korean writers
Korean politicians
Korean independence activists
Korean educators
Yun Chi-ho
19th-century Korean novelists
20th-century Korean novelists
Korean anti-communists
Korean collaborators with Imperial Japan
Korean feminists
Male feminists
Jeonju Yi clan
20th-century deaths from tuberculosis
Tuberculosis deaths in North Korea